Hystricosphodrus is a genus of ground beetles in the family Carabidae. This genus has a single species, Hystricosphodrus vailatii. It is found in Greece.

References

Platyninae